49er & 49er FX Asian Championships are annual Asian Championship sailing regattas in the 49er and the 49er FX classes organised by the International 49er Class Association.

Editions

References

49er competitions
49er FX competitions
Asian championships in sailing